The AAC Honey Badger PDW is a personal defense weapon, frequently used in a suppressed configuration and is based on the AR-15. It is chambered in .300 AAC Blackout and was originally produced by Advanced Armament Corporation (AAC). The weapon is named after the honey badger.

Design
Both the rifle and the cartridge used were developed in close co-operation with American Special Operations units to create a suitable and effective replacement for the HK MP5 and similar close quarters combat weapon systems. The rifle is designed to be very convenient for military use where M16s are issued and in common use, since many similarities would exist in the fire controls, weapon manipulation, and magazines. The weapon is suppressed and it can be made even quieter by using heavy subsonic .300 Blackout ammunition. The weapon is sometimes wrongly referred to as being "integrally suppressed" which it is not. It just has a short barrel and a big conventional suppressor.

Kevin Brittingham, the founder of AAC, wanted to design a weapon which had the ease of use of an AR-15, but the portability of an MP5.

The Honey Badger was developed with a standard M4 upper and lower receiver, a short barrel with a very short gas impingement system and fast rate of rifling twist, a large conventional detachable silencer, and a proprietary buffer tube and collapsible stock featuring two prongs. Whilst with the added silencer, it is 7.62-15.24 cm longer than the MP5SD, the mass is nearly identical unloaded.

Replacement
In 2013, AAC began focusing their efforts on the production of suppressors. “We made the decision that we are getting out of the rifle-making business,” stated Jeff Still, Director of Accessories and Silencers at Remington Outdoor Company. “We are going to focus all of our efforts on silencers and related accessories.” In 2017, Kevin Brittingham founded a new company named "Q, LLC". Along with suppressors and a bolt-action rifle of their own design, Q has also developed and marketed an improved Honey Badger.

Cease and desist 
On October 6, 2020, the ATF sent Q a cease and desist letter, asserting that the Honey Badger pistol was a short-barreled rifle. Though Q tried to resist this claim, they ceased production of the weapon, and confirmed this in an official statement on the 14th. On October 15, the ATF gave their cease and desist a 60-day suspension, but Q chose not to resume production of the Honey Badger until the ATF made a definitive decision, as they believed "the ATF could arbitrarily withdraw the suspension at any time."

See also
GA Personal Defense Weapon – another AR-15-based PDW, chambered in 7.62×37mm Musang.
Magpul PDR – a bullpup PDW chambered in 5.56×45mm NATO.

References

External links
Advanced Armament Corp.’s PDW in 300 BLK: the Honey Badger Guns.com
Original product concept by Robert S. Silvers
Honey Badger by Q

.300 BLK firearms
Proposed weapons of the United States
Personal defense weapons
Semi-automatic rifles
Firearms articles needing expert attention
ArmaLite AR-10 derivatives
AR-15 style rifles